Alan Russell-Cowan aka Alan Streets is an English artist.  He was born in London in 1970, his mother is German, his father English.  He has been painting since the age of 8 and is primarily self-taught. Alan believes that his schizophrenia has been the passion and inspiration of his painting, and that his painting has been the stimulus for the suppression of his symptoms of schizophrenia. He paints obsessively and prolifically. He stars in the documentary My Name Is Alan and I Paint Pictures, which covers six years of his life and focuses on the relationship between his diagnosis of paranoid schizophrenia and his struggle to find success in the art world.

He specializes in stylized landscapes of New York City, San Francisco, and other US cities along with his native England.  He also paints imaginary visualizations of his perceived realities.

References

External links
Alan Russell-Cowan’s Website.
WTC attack through artist's eyes. Soho Journal Fall 2001
Using Art To Exorcise His Demons. New York Times Sept 19 2007
El Paso Catches Artist's Eye. El Paso Times Texas Nov 28 2006
For artist, the city is his muse. News Day 07 Nov 07, 2008

20th-century English painters
English male painters
21st-century English painters
Living people
Year of birth missing (living people)
20th-century English male artists
21st-century English male artists